Parliamentary elections were held in Syria on 22 and 23 May 1990. No political parties were permitted outside the National Progressive Front, though candidates outside this group could run as independents. Approximately 9,000 candidates ran as independents. Members were elected using the multiple non-transferable vote in fifteen districts, with an average district magnitude of 16.6. The result was a victory for the Ba'ath Party, which won 134 of the 250 seats. Voter turnout was 49.6%.

Results

References

Syria
1990 in Syria
Parliamentary elections in Syria
Election and referendum articles with incomplete results